Michael Steven Rodríguez Gutiérrez (born 30 December 1981) is a Costa Rican former footballer who most recently played for the National Premier Soccer League club Puerto Rico Bayamón.

Club career
Until recently, Rodríguez played club football for Alajuelense.

In June 2008, he signed with the Seattle Sounders of the USL First Division in the United States. He currently has not played for the club, as he is awaiting his P1 Visa.

On 24 June, Rodríguez made his debut for the Sounders in a match against Hollywood United F.C. in the 2008 Lamar Hunt U.S. Open Cup. In January 2010 he joined Pérez Zeledón.

In October 2012, Rodríguez moved abroad to play for Indian outfit United Sikkim but he returned in June 2013 to play for Pérez Zeledón. In September 2014 he was denied a work permit by the United States to play for Puerto Rican side Puerto Rico Bayamón after playing for them in the CONCACAF Champions League.

International career
Rodríguez played at the 2001 FIFA World Youth Championship held in Argentina.

He made his senior debut for Costa Rica in a February 2006 friendly match against South Korea and earned a total of 3 caps, scoring no goals. He also represented his country in the 2006 FIFA World Cup, although he did not see any playing time during the tournament.

His final international was a May 2006 World Cup warm-up match against Ukraine.

References

External links

1981 births
Living people
People from Alajuela (canton)
Association football defenders
Costa Rican footballers
Costa Rica international footballers
Olympic footballers of Costa Rica
Footballers at the 2004 Summer Olympics
2006 FIFA World Cup players
L.D. Alajuelense footballers
A.D. Ramonense players
Seattle Sounders (1994–2008) players
Brujas FC players
Municipal Pérez Zeledón footballers
C.S. Herediano footballers
United Sikkim F.C. players
Liga FPD players
Costa Rican expatriate footballers
Expatriate soccer players in the United States
Expatriate footballers in India
USL First Division players
Costa Rican expatriate sportspeople in India